The twelfth series of the children's television series Hi-5 aired between 13 September 2010 and 12 November 2010 on the Nine Network in Australia. The series was produced by Southern Star and Nine with Noel Price as executive producer. The series featured the 500th episode.

Production

Following the Nine Network and  Southern Star's acquisition of the Hi-5 franchise in 2008, a deal was made to produce five new series of the programme featuring the "new generation" cast. Southern Star produced the first of these five series in 2009, and begun production of the second in 2010.

Noel Price returned as the executive producer for his second series, continuing the goal of capturing the innocence and magic of the program's earlier episodes. All five cast members, Lauren Brant, Casey Burgess, Fely Irvine, Tim Maddren and Stevie Nicholson, returned for the twelfth series.

The twelfth series premiered on 13 September 2010. It contained the 500th episode of Hi-5, which aired in October. The series debuted nine new feature Songs of the Week and introduced a new element in the Sharing Stories segment; a "Hidden Treasure" for viewers to search for.

Cast

Presenters
 Lauren Brant – Body Move
 Casey Burgess – Word Play
 Fely Irvine – Puzzles and Patterns
 Tim Maddren – Making Music
 Stevie Nicholson – Shapes in Space

Episodes

Home video releases

Compilation releases

Full episode releases

Awards and nominations

References

External links
 Hi-5 Website

2010 Australian television seasons